Nechtan, son of Erip, was the king of the Picts from 456 to 480.

The king lists supply a number of epithets for Nechtan: Morbet and Celchamoth and the Latin Magnus (the Great). He is said to have reigned for twenty-four years. In a rare change from a bald statement of names and years, the king lists provide a tradition linking Nechtan to the foundation of Abernethy:"So Nectonius the Great, Wirp's son, the king of all the provinces of the Picts, offered to Saint Brigid, to the day of judgement, Abernethy, with its territories ... Now the cause of the offering was this. Nectonius, living in a life of exile, when his brother Drest expelled him to Ireland, begged Saint Brigid to beseech God for him. And she prayed for him, and said: "If thou reach thy country, the Lord will have pity on thee. Thou shalt possess in peace the kingdom of the Picts."

A life of Saint Boite, after whom Monasterboice is named, claims that Boite raised Nechtan from the dead, and associated him with Kirkbuddo in Strathmore.

It has been suggested that these traditions should be associated with a later Pictish king, with the very similar name of Nechtan son of Irb.

Nothing else can be said of Nechtan with any certainty.

Notes

References

External links
Pictish Chronicle

5th-century births
480 deaths
Pictish monarchs
5th-century Scottish monarchs